Haven Jesse Barlow (January 4, 1922 – February 6, 2022) was an American politician who was a Republican member of the Utah House of Representatives from 1952 to 1955 and Utah State Senate from 1955 to 1994. An alumnus of Utah State University and the Harvard Business School, and veteran of World War II where he served in the United States Navy, he was also the president and founder of Barlow Realty and Insurance. He was also a director of the Utah Symphony. Barlow served as president of the Utah Senate from 1967 to 1972.

Barlow turned 100 in January 2022, and died one month later on February 6, 2022.

References

1922 births
2022 deaths
Republican Party members of the Utah House of Representatives
People from Clearfield, Utah
Republican Party Utah state senators
Businesspeople from Utah
Military personnel from Utah
United States Navy personnel of World War II
Harvard Business School alumni
Utah State University alumni
Men centenarians
American centenarians